Flupentixol (INN), also known as flupenthixol (former BAN), marketed under brand names such as Depixol and Fluanxol is a typical antipsychotic drug of the thioxanthene class. It was introduced in 1965 by Lundbeck. In addition to single drug preparations, it is also available as flupentixol/melitracen—a combination product containing both melitracen (a tricyclic antidepressant) and flupentixol (marketed as Deanxit).
Flupentixol is  not approved for use in the United States. It is, however, approved for use in the UK, Australia, Canada, Russian Federation, South Africa, New Zealand, Philippines, Iran, Germany, Islamic State and various other countries.

Medical uses 
Flupentixol's main use is as a long-acting injection given once in every two or three weeks to individuals with schizophrenia who have poor compliance with medication and have frequent relapses of illness, though it is also commonly given as a tablet. There is little formal evidence to support its use for this indication but it has been in use for over fifty years.

Flupentixol is also used in low doses as an antidepressant. There is tentative evidence that it reduces the rate of deliberate self-harm, among those who self-harm repeatedly.

Adverse effects 
Adverse effect incidence

Common (>1% incidence) adverse effects include
 Extrapyramidal side effects such as: (which usually become apparent soon after therapy is begun or soon after an increase in dose is made)
 Muscle rigidity
 Hypokinesia
 Hyperkinesia
 Parkinsonism
 Tremor
 Akathisia
 Dystonia
 Dry mouth
 Constipation
 Hypersalivation – excessive salivation
 Blurred vision
 Diaphoresis – excessive sweating
 Nausea
 Dizziness
 Somnolence
 Restlessness
 Insomnia
 Overactivity
 Headache
 Nervousness
 Fatigue
 Myalgia
 Hyperprolactinemia and its complications such as: (acutely)
 Sexual dysfunction
 Amenorrhea – cessation of menstrual cycles
 Gynecomastia – enlargement of breast tissue in males
 Galactorrhea – the expulsion of breast milk that's not related to breastfeeding or pregnancy
 and if the hyperprolactinemia persists chronically, the following adverse effects may be seen:
 Reduced bone mineral density leading to osteoporosis (brittle bones)
 Infertility
 Dyspepsia – indigestion
 Abdominal pain
 Flatulence
 Nasal congestion
 Polyuria – passing more urine than usual

Uncommon (0.1–1% incidence) adverse effects include
 Fainting
 Palpitations

Rare (<0.1% incidence) adverse effects include
 Blood dyscrasias (abnormalities in the cell composition of blood), such as:
 Agranulocytosis – a drop in white blood cell counts that leaves one open to potentially life-threatening infections
 Neutropenia – a drop in the number of neutrophils (white blood cells that specifically fight bacteria) in one's blood
 Leucopenia – a less severe drop in white blood cell counts than agranulocytosis
 Thrombocytopenia – a drop in the number of platelets in the blood. Platelets are responsible for blood clotting and hence this leads to an increased risk of bruising and other bleeds
 Neuroleptic malignant syndrome – a potentially fatal condition that appear to result from central D2 receptor blockade. The symptoms include:
 Hyperthermia
 Muscle rigidity
 Rhabdomyolysis
 Autonomic instability (e.g. tachycardia, diarrhea, diaphoresis, etc.)
 Mental status changes (e.g. coma, agitation, anxiety, confusion, etc.)

Unknown incidence adverse effects include
 Jaundice
 Abnormal liver function test results
 Tardive dyskinesia – an often incurable movement disorder that usually results from years of continuous treatment with antipsychotic drugs, especially typical antipsychotics like flupenthixol. It presents with repetitive, involuntary, purposeless and slow movements; TD can be triggered by a fast dose reduction in any antipsychotic.
 Hypotension
 Confusional state
 Seizures
 Mania
 Hypomania
 Depression
 Hot flush
 Anergia
 Appetite changes
 Weight changes
 Hyperglycemia – high blood glucose (sugar) levels
 Abnormal glucose tolerance
 Pruritus – itchiness
 Rash
 Dermatitis
 Photosensitivity – sensitivity to light
 Oculogyric crisis
 Accommodation disorder
 Sleep disorder
 Impaired concentration
 Tachycardia
 QTc interval prolongation – an abnormality in the electrical activity of the heart that can lead to potentially fatal changes in heart rhythm (only in overdose or <10 ms increases in QTc)
 Torsades de pointes
 Miosis – constriction of the pupil of the eye
 Paralytic ileus – paralysis of the bowel muscles leading to severe constipation, inability to pass wind, etc.
 Mydriasis
 Glaucoma

Interactions 

It should not be used concomitantly with medications known to prolong the QTc interval (e.g. 5-HT3 antagonists, tricyclic antidepressants, citalopram, etc.) as this may lead to an increased risk of QTc interval prolongation. Neither should it be given concurrently with lithium (medication) as it may increase the risk of lithium toxicity and neuroleptic malignant syndrome. It should not be given concurrently with other antipsychotics due to the potential for this to increase the risk of side effects, especially neurological side effects such as neuroleptic malignant syndrome. It should be avoided in patients on CNS depressants such as opioids, alcohol and barbiturates.

Contraindications
It should not be given in the following disease states:
 Pheochromocytoma
 Prolactin-dependent tumors such as pituitary prolactinomas and breast cancer
 Long QT syndrome
 Coma
 Circulatory collapse
 Subcortical brain damage
 Blood dyscrasia
 Parkinson's disease
 Dementia with Lewy bodies

Pharmacology

Pharmacodynamics
Binding profile

Acronyms used:
HFC – Human frontal cortex receptor
MB – Mouse brain receptor
RC – Cloned rat receptor

A study measuring the in vivo receptor occupancies of 13 schizophrenic patients treated with 5.7 ± 1.4 mg/day of flupentixol found 50-70% receptor occupancy for D2, 20 ± 5% for D1, and 20 ± 10% for 5-HT2A.

Its antipsychotic effects are predominantly a function of D2 antagonism.

Its antidepressant effects at lower doses are not well understood; however, it may be mediated by functional selectivity and/or preferentially binding to D2 autoreceptors at low doses, resulting in increased postsynaptic activation via higher dopamine levels. Flupentixol's demonstrated ability to raise dopamine levels in mice and flies lends credibility to the supposition of autoreceptor bias. Functional selectivity may be responsible through causing preferential autoreceptor binding or other means. The effective dosage guideline for an antipsychotic is very closely related to its receptor residency time (i.e. where drugs like aripiprazole take several minutes or more to disassociate from a receptor while drugs like quetiapine and clozapine—with guideline dosages in the hundreds of milligrams—take under 30s) and long receptor residency time is strongly correlated with likehood of pronounced functional selectivity; thus, with a maximum guideline dose of only 18 mg/day for schizophrenia, there is a significant possibility of this drug possessing unique signalling characteristics that permit counterintuitive dopaminergic action at low doses.

Pharmacokinetics

History
In March 1963 the Danish pharmaceutical company Lundbeck began research into further agents for schizophrenia, having already developed the thioxanthene derivatives clopenthixol and chlorprothixene. By 1965 the promising agent flupenthixol had been developed and trialled in two hospitals in Vienna by Austrian psychiatrist Heinrich Gross. The long- acting decanoate preparation was synthesised in 1967 and introduced into hospital practice in Sweden in 1968, with a reduction in relapses among patients who were put on the depot.

References 

Typical antipsychotics
Antidepressants
Trifluoromethyl compounds
Piperazines
Thioxanthene antipsychotics